Gavin James Robinson (born 22 November 1984) is a Democratic Unionist Party (DUP) politician and barrister. He has been the  Member of Parliament (MP) for Belfast East in the UK House of Commons since the 2015 general election. He was Lord Mayor of Belfast in 2012–2013.

Career
Robinson is a lifelong East Belfast resident. He attended Grosvenor Grammar School in East Belfast, and then University of Ulster where obtained a degree in law and government, before attending Queen's University Belfast, where he attained a Masters in Irish Politics before commencing practice as a barrister. Raised a Presbyterian, he currently attends the Church of Ireland. He is married. Gavin Robinson is unrelated to former DUP leader and Belfast East MP Peter Robinson.

Robinson was co-opted to Belfast City Council in March 2010 to replace Sammy Wilson in representing the Pottinger electoral area of South and East Belfast. He was returned to the council as an alderman in the 2011 local elections and elected Lord Mayor by the council for the year beginning 1 June 2012. He was a member of the East Belfast District Policing and Community Safety Partnership subgroup and represented the council on the boards of the Ulster Orchestra and the 2013 World Police and Fire Games held in Belfast.

He won the constituency of Belfast East for the Democratic Unionist Party, defeating the incumbent Naomi Long of the Alliance Party, to become a Member of Parliament in the 2015 UK General Election.

In March 2019, Robinson was one of 21 MPs who voted against LGBT-inclusive sex and relationship education in English schools.

References

External links

Gavin Robinson at Belfast City Council

1984 births
Living people
Converts to Anglicanism from Presbyterianism
Democratic Unionist Party politicians
Democratic Unionist Party MPs
Former Presbyterians
Anglicans from Northern Ireland
Lord Mayors of Belfast
Members of the Parliament of the United Kingdom for Belfast constituencies (since 1922)
UK MPs 2015–2017
UK MPs 2017–2019
UK MPs 2019–present
Alumni of Queen's University Belfast